The York Realist is a 2001 play by Peter Gill.  It was premiered at the Lowry in November 2001 before moving to the Bristol Old Vic and the Royal Court Theatre in January 2002 by English Touring Theatre, with Gill himself directing. It transferred to the Strand Theatre in March 2002.

Nick Curtis and Jessie Thompson writing for the Evening Standard, listed The York Realist as one of the 50 Best Plays of the 21st century.

Plot
It is set in the early 1960s and revolves around George (a Yorkshire farm labourer involved in a production of the York Mystery Plays who withdraws from the production), John (the production's shy assistant director who tries to convince him to come back), the love affair between them, and the clash between regional and London culture.

Reception
Reviews of the original production ranged from "a rare blast of reality" (the Guardian) to a "stunningly boring slab of dour social realism" (the Telegraph).

The play was nominated for Best New Play at the Olivier Awards and Evening Standard Theatre Awards and won the Critics Circle Award for Best New Play.

Original cast
George - Lloyd Owen
John - Richard Coyle
George and Barbara's Mother - Anne Reid
Barbara - Caroline O'Neill
Arthur - Ian Mercer
Doreen - Wendy Nottingham
Jack - Felix Bell

Creative Team
Director - Peter Gill
Designer - William Dudley
Lighting Designer - Hartley T A Kemp
Composer - Terry Davies
Assistant Director - Josie Rourke
Dialect Coach - Jeanette Nelson

Revivals
The play was revived in October 2009 at Riverside Studios by Good Night Out Presents. The production received positive reviews, with Michael Billington describing the production as "lovingly revived by Adam Spreadbury-Maher" (the Guardian). The production was seen as particularly fitting given that Gill founded the Riverside Studios in 1975, and that this would be the first Gill production at the theatre for 30 years. The play was revived in September 2009 at the Riverside Studios by the company Good Night Out Presents, to mark Gill's 70th birthday. It was revived again in February 2018 at the Donmar Warehouse.

Riverside Studios Creative Team

Director - Adam Spreadbury-Maher
Designer - Kate Guinness
Costume Designer - Mia Thomson
Lighting Designer - Steve Lowe

Donmar Warehouse Creative Team

Director - Robert Hastie
Set and Costume Designer - Peter McKintosh
Lighting Designer - Paul Pyant
Sound Designer - Emma Laxton
Composer - Richard Taylor

References

External links 
The York Realist homepage

2002 plays
English plays